Charlotte Cotton is a curator of and writer about photography.

She has held positions including Head of the Wallis Annenberg Photography Department at the Los Angeles County Museum of Art, Head of Programming at The Photographers' Gallery, London, Curator of Photography at the Victoria and Albert Museum, London, Curator in Residence at the Katonah Museum of Art, NY. She is currently Curator-in-Residence at the California Museum of Photography, in Riverside, CA.

Cotton has curated a number of exhibitions on contemporary photography, and her publications include The Photograph as Contemporary Art, Imperfect Beauty, Then Things Went Quiet, Guy Bourdin, and Photography is Magic. She is also the founder of wordswithoutpictures.org (2008–9) and EitherAnd.org (2012). Words Without Pictures was published by Aperture in 2010.

Early life and education
Cotton was born in the Cotswolds in England. She studied Art History at the University of Sussex in Brighton.

Career

Victoria and Albert Museum 
Cotton was curator of photographs at the Victoria and Albert Museum from 1993 to 2004. She started working as an intern there in 1992. She curated many exhibitions of historical and contemporary photography at the museum including: Imperfect Beauty: the making of contemporary fashion photographs (2000), Out of Japan (2002), Stepping In and Out: contemporary documentary photography (2003) and Guy Bourdin (2003).

The Photographers' Gallery 
Cotton was Head of Programming at The Photographers' Gallery, London from 2004 to 2005.

Los Angeles County Museum of Art
Cotton was Curator and Head of the Wallis Annenberg Department of Photography at Los Angeles County Museum of Art (LACMA) from 2007 to 2009.

"Charlotte's career bridges the traditional and the contemporary. That is her real strength," said LACMA Director Michael Govan. "At the Victoria & Albert, she dealt with a collection of some 300,000 photographs that has great 19th century and early 20th century material, so she had a real grounding in a big museum collection and historic work. Then she gave it up to experiment and learn more about photography in the contemporary world. She has had huge experience, and she has taken risks. That's a good combination."

Other positions
She has also held positions of Creative Director at the National Media Museum, UK, and Curator in Residence for International Center of Photography's  new museum and events space, 250 Bowery, and Curator in Residence at Metabolic Studio, LA where she participated in a program celebrating the legacy of the Woman's Building, founded by Judy Chicago, Sheila Levrant de Bretteville and Arlene Raven. She is currently Curator-in-Residence at the California Museum of Photography, in Riverside, CA.

Cotton has been a visiting critic and scholar at numerous universities and schools in the US and the UK including: NYU Tisch, New York; CCA, San Francisco; Parsons and SVA, New York; Yale University, New Haven; UPenn, Philadelphia; and UCLA, USC, UC Irvine, Los Angeles; Farnham College, Surrey Institute of Design, UK.

Works

The Photograph as Contemporary Art 
The book The Photograph as Contemporary Art provides an introduction to contemporary art-photography, identifying its most important features and themes and celebrating its pluralism through an overview of its most important and innovative practitioners. The work of nearly 250 photographers is reproduced, from established artists such as Isa Genzken, Jeff Wall, Sophie Calle, Thomas Demand, Nan Goldin, and Sherrie Levine to emerging talents such Walead Beshty, Jason Evans, Lucas Blalock, Sara VanDerBeek, and Viviane Sassen.

The first edition of The Photograph as Contemporary Art was published in 2004. The third was published in 2014 and has a new introduction and extended final chapter.

The Photograph as Contemporary Art is published in nine languages.

Photography is Magic 
Photography is Magic is a critical book that surveys the work of over eighty artists, all of whom have experimental approaches to photographic ideas, set within the contemporary image environment, framed by Web 2.0. Photography is Magic surveys over eighty artists whose practices are shaping the possibilities of the contemporary photographic landscape. The contributors include Elad Lassry, Sara VanDerBeek and Kate Steciw.

Curated projects
Exhibitions organized and co-organized by Cotton:
 Fashion on Paper & Contemporary Fashion Photography, Victoria and Albert Museum, London, 1997
 Information Units: A digital programme exploring the V&A's Photography Collection. Devised and launched between April and November 1998 
 Silver & Syrup: a selected history of photography, Victoria and Albert Museum, London, 1998/99
 Triple Exposure: Three Photographers From the Sixties, Victoria and Albert Museum, London, 1999/2000
 Attitude: A History of Posing, Victoria and Albert Museum, London, 2000/01
 Imperfect Beauty: The Making of Contemporary Fashion Photographs, Victoria and Albert Museum, London, 2000/01
 Out of Japan: Felice Beato, Masahisa Fukase, Naoya Hatakeyama, Victoria and Albert Museum, London, 2001/02
 Stepping In and Out: Contemporary Documentary Photography: Roger Ballen, Tina Barney, Donovan Wylie, Clare Richardson, Albrecht Tubke, Victoria and Albert Museum, London, 2002/03
 Guy Bourdin, Victoria and Albert Museum, London (2003); National Gallery Victoria (2003); Centre Nationale de la Photographie Paris (2004); Foam Amsterdam (2004)
 History in the Making: Mitch Epstein, Adam Broomberg and Oliver Chanarin, Ori Gersht, Zineb Sedira, Zoran Nazkovski. Circulos des Bellas Artes, Madrid PhotoEspana, 2004
 Stories from Russia: Melanie Manchot & David King, The Photographers' Gallery, London, 2005
 Art + Commerce Festival of Emerging Photographers, The Tobacco Warehouse, Brooklyn, 2005; MOC Gallery, Tokyo (2006); Fendi Gallery, Milan (2006); Matadero Madrid (2006, PHotoEspaña); Center for Photography, Stockholm (2006, XpoSweden) 
 Philip-Lorca diCorcia, LACMA, Los Angeles, 2008
 The Marjorie and Leonard Vernon Collection, LACMA, Los Angeles, 2008/09
 Vanity Fair Portraits: Photographs 1913 ~ 2008, LACMA, Los Angeles, 2008/09 
 A Machine Project Field Guide to the LA County Museum of Art, LACMA, Los Angeles, 2008
 EATLACMA, LACMA, Los Angeles, 2010  
 Brighton Photo Fringe, Phoenix Arts, Brighton, 2011
 Krakow Photomonth: Photography in Everyday Life, Bunkier Sztuki, Krakow, 2012 
 Daegu Photo Biennale: Photography Is Magic!, Daegu Arts and Culture Centre, Daegu, 2012 
 Photoespaña 2014: P2P, Teatro Fernan Gomez, Madrid, 2014
 This Place, DOX center, Prague, 2014/15; Tel Aviv Museum, 2015; Norton Museum, Palm Beach, 2015; Brooklyn Museum, Brooklyn, 2016
 SupraEnvironmental, Katonah Museum of Art, New York, 2015/16  
 Photography is Magic: Aperture Summer Open, Aperture Foundation, New York, 2016 
 Public, Private, Secret, International Center of Photography, New York, 2016/17 
 Close Enough: New Perspectives from 12 Women Photographers of Magnum, International Center of Photography, New York, 29 September 2022 – 9 January 2023

Publications
Books that Cotton has authored and edited:

 (Editor, essay)

 (Essay, published for LACMA)
 (Founder of wordswithoutpictures.org, co-editor, essay, published for LACMA)
 (Commissioned and published for LACMA)
 (Essay, co-published for LACMA)
 (Commissioned and published for LACMA)
 (Commissioned and published for LACMA)
 (Exhibition catalogue, essay, artists' biographies)
 (Third edition with new introduction and extended final chapter)
 (Exhibition catalogue, editor, essay, interviews)
 Cotton, Charlotte (2015). Photography is Magic. Aperture. .
 Cotton, Charlotte (2018). Public, Private, Secret: On Photography and the Configuration of Self. Aperture. 
 Cotton, Charlotte (2018). Fashion Image Revolution. Prestel.

References

Year of birth missing (living people)
American women photographers
Living people
21st-century American women
American women curators
American curators